The 2023 NRL Telstra Premiership season is historically the first that the Dolphins participate in the National Rugby League football competition in Australia. The head coach is Wayne Bennett, and Jesse Bromwich is the inaugural captain.

Player Movements

All 2023 Signings

2023 Pre-Season Challenge

2023 Regular Season 

The Dolphins play most of their twelve home games at the 52,500-capacity Suncorp Stadium in Brisbane, with a few other matches at Sunshine Coast Stadium and Kayo Stadium, which also serves as a training and administration base. In the 'Score' column below, the Dolphins score is recorded first and the opponent's next.

2023 Squad

References

Dolphins season
2023 NRL Women's season